Mansur Khan may refer to:

 Mansur Khan (qollar-aghasi), Safavid military commander
 Mansur Khan (Moghul Khan) (died 1543), khan of eastern Moghulistan
 Mansur Ali Khan (1830–1884), Nawab of Bengal